Karr is a Gaelic surname derived from the Old Norse Kjarr. The surname Carr and its variants date back to the Battle Abbey Roll from 1066 after the Anglo Norman invasion of William the Conqueror. The surname appears in the Old Norse genealogical section of the Flateyjarbók the largest medieval Icelandic manuscript. In Skáldskaparmál, Snorri Sturluson lists Kjarr as a descendant of Auði, the founder of the Ödling dynasty. In the Heimskringla by Snorri Sturluson, Valland is mentioned several times as the Old Norse name for Gaul. It was the country where Rollo carved out Normandy: Kjárr, usually a king of the Valir. Kíarr/Kjárr is generally recognized to stem from Latin Caesar. Early Scandinavian links with Gothic regions suggest it also could have come from Greek kaîsar, perhaps through Gothic Kaiser. The Scottish variant being Kerr and the Irish variant being Carr from the Celtic word ciar which was derived from O'Ciarain or O'Ceirin. The word car itself is an anglicized variation from the Gaulish word carros; a wheeled cart or chariot.

People with the surname
 Barry Karr, executive director for Center for Inquiry
 Benn Karr (1893–1968), pitcher in Major League Baseball
 Bill Karr (1911–1979), American football end
 Carmen Karr (1865–1943), Catalan feminist, journalist, writer, and musicologist
 David Karr (1918–1979)
 Dean Karr (born 1965), American photographer and music video, commercial, and film director
 Gary Karr (born 1942), American classical double bass player and teacher
 Jean-Baptiste Alphonse Karr (1808–1890), French critic, journalist and novelist
 Jerry Karr (1936–2019), American farmer and politician
 John Mark Karr, former suspect in the JonBenét Ramsey murder case
 Mariana Karr (1949–2016), Argentine-Mexican actress
 Mary Karr (born 1955),  American poet and memoirist
 Ron Karr, American speaker, marketing consultant and author

Fictional
 Mike Karr, a character in The Edge of Night

See also
 KARR (disambiguation)
Karra (name)
 Kerr (surname)
 Carr (surname)
 Kar (suffix)

References

Surnames
Surnames of Scandinavian origin
Icelandic-language surnames
Surnames of Norman origin